Hans Haas (17 October 1906 – 14 May 1973) was an Austrian weightlifter who competed in the 1928 Summer Olympics and in the 1932 Summer Olympics. He was born in Vienna.

In 1926, he became Austrian champion for the first time and in 1928 he won the gold medal in the lightweight class. Four years later at the 1932 Games he won the silver medal in the lightweight class. Dr. George Eisen of Nazareth College included Haas on his list of Jewish Olympic Medalists.

See also
List of select Jewish weightlifters

References

External links

1906 births
1973 deaths
Austrian male weightlifters
Olympic weightlifters of Austria
Weightlifters at the 1928 Summer Olympics
Weightlifters at the 1932 Summer Olympics
Olympic gold medalists for Austria
Olympic silver medalists for Austria
World record setters in weightlifting
Sportspeople from Vienna
Olympic medalists in weightlifting
Medalists at the 1932 Summer Olympics
Medalists at the 1928 Summer Olympics
20th-century Austrian people